The Geelong Baseball Association (GBA), is an Australian baseball association and league based in Geelong, Victoria.

It runs the Geelong Winter League, one of the premier winter competitions in Victoria. The GBA is affiliated with Baseball Victoria.

Established in 1937, the GBA offers senior and junior competitions to clubs and teams from metropolitan Geelong, Colac, Werribee, Bacchus Marsh, Lara, Newport and Ballarat. Competition is conducted from early April through to September.

History
In 1889, the first match of interest played at Geelong between Melbourne and Geelong Baseball Clubs. Melbourne won the game 25–15.

Established over seventy years ago, in 1937 the GBA offers senior and junior competitions to clubs and teams from metropolitan Geelong, Colac, Werribee, Bacchus Marsh, Lara and Ballarat.

Clubs
 Alfredton Eagles
 Bacchus Marsh Tigers
 Ballarat Royals
 Bellarine Bears
 Colac Braves
 Corio Tigers
 Deakin Blues
 East Belmont Saints
 Guild Lions
 Lara Wildcats
 Newport Rams
 Sunshine Eagles

See also
 List of baseball teams in Australia

References

External links
 Official website
 History Snapshot

Sport in Geelong
Organisations based in Geelong
Baseball leagues in Australia
1937 establishments in Australia
Sports organizations established in 1937